Rebecca Jenkins (born 1959) is a Canadian actress and singer.

Acting
She had starring roles in the 1990s CBC series Black Harbour, and the films Bye Bye Blues, Marion Bridge, Wilby Wonderful, Whole New Thing, South of Wawa and Supervolcano. She also had a supporting role in the 1992 film Bob Roberts, as Dolores Perrigrew. In NBC's miniseries 10.5 she portrayed California governor Carla Williams.

Jenkins appeared in the January 17, 2006, episode of the WB series Supernatural, where she played the loving wife to a faith healer. Her next project was a television movie entitled Past Sins directed by David Winning, in which she co-starred with Lauralee Bell. Past Sins aired on Lifetime in November, 2006.

In 2012, she appeared in Sarah Polley's documentary film Stories We Tell, playing Polley's mother Diane in dramatic recreations.

Music
As a singer, Jenkins has primarily been a backing vocalist for Jane Siberry and The Parachute Club. Early in her career, she provided the voicings of the mermaids in the 1987 film I've Heard the Mermaids Singing. She has also recorded tracks for a number of Canadian benefit and compilation albums, and participated in the Count Your Blessings concert with Siberry, Holly Cole, Mary Margaret O'Hara and Victoria Williams. As well, Jenkins is featured prominently on the Bye Bye Blues soundtrack album; her character in the film is a woman who takes up jazz singing to support her family while her husband is away during World War II. She also performed the title track "Bye Bye Blues" in Calgary at the September 1, 2005, opening the night of the celebration of Alberta's centennial.

In 2007, she was scheduled to release her first solo album, a collection of jazz standards. Her husband, Joel Bakan, a jazz guitarist, accompanied her as well as Al Matheson on trumpet and Liam Macdonald on drums and percussion. 

She cohosted a five-week radio series called Quiet, There's a Lady on Stage with singer-songwriter David Ramsden. The radio show was recorded with four new female singers weekly in the CBC's Glenn Gould Studio. Guests included Carole Pope, Holly Cole, Lee Whalen, Lori Yates, Molly Johnson, Kate Fenner and Mary Margaret O'Hara.

She married Joel Bakan, the writer of the book and documentary film The Corporation, in July 2004.

Filmography

Film

Television

References

External links

1959 births
Canadian women jazz singers
Canadian film actresses
Canadian television actresses
Canadian voice actresses
Best Actress Genie and Canadian Screen Award winners
Living people
People from Red Deer County
Actresses from Alberta
The Parachute Club members
People from Innisfail, Alberta